The 2012 Warrington Borough Council election took place on 3 May 2012 to elect 19 of the 57 members of the Warrington Borough Council in England. They comprised part of the United Kingdom's local elections of 2012.

Results

Ward Results

Appleton

Bewsey and Whitecross

Birchwood

Burtonwood & Winwick

Culceth Glazebury & Croft

Fairfield & Howley

Grappenhall & Thelwall

Great Sankey South

Halton Stretton & Walton

Lymm

Orford

Penketh & Cuerdley

Poplars & Hulme

Poulton North

Poulton South

Rixton & Woolston

Stockton Heath

Westbrook

Whittle Hall

References

External links

2012 English local elections
2012
2010s in Cheshire